Rampur is a town in Ranchi district, Jharkhand, India.

Geography

Location
National Highway 33 passes through Rampur.

References

External links
 About Rampur
 Satellite map of Rampur

Cities and towns in Ranchi district